Carrier Air Wing Six (CVW-6) was a United States Navy aircraft carrier air wing whose operational history spans from the middle of World War II to the end of the Cold War. Established in 1943 as Carrier Air Group Seventeen (CVG-17), it would be re-designated several times during its establishment, including Carrier Air Group Six (CVG-6) as the second unit to be so designated. The first Carrier Air Group Six served for just over two years during World War II, but drew on the history of the Enterprise Air Group established in 1938 and active in the early battles of the Pacific War, being disestablished after the first year of the conflict.

History
Carrier Air Wing 6 was established on 1 January 1943 as Carrier Air Group 17 (CVG-17).

Carrier Air Group 17 (CVG-17) and (CVBG-17) (1943–1946)
The Air Group served throughout WWII as CVG-17. After the war, on 22 January 1946 the group was redesignated CVBG-17, the "B" indicating it was configured to be assigned to one of the new Midway class aircraft carriers.

Battle Carrier Air Group 5 (1946–1948)
On 15 November 1946 the Navy instituted a new Carrier Air Group designation scheme and all air groups assigned to the smaller WWII Essex class carriers were designated CVAG and all configured for the larger Midway class carriers were designated CVBG. The three CVBGs were numbered from 1 through 5 with CVBG-17 becoming CVBG-5.  CVBG-5 participated in the shakedown cruises for Essex-class fleet carrier  and the Midway-class battle aircraft carrier .

Deployments
The Battle Carrier Air Group 5 deployments, 1946–1948
Table 3 denotes the deployments of CVBG-5.

Carrier Air Group 6 (1948–1963)

On 1 September 1948 the Navy again changed the Carrier Air Group designation scheme redesigning all CVAGs and CVBGs to CVGs and CVBG-5 became  Carrier Air Group Six (CVG-6) (it was the second use of the CVG-6 designation, the first air group designated CVG-6 was a WWII air group which existed from March 1943 to October 1945). CVG-6 participated in three major NATO naval exercises, 1952's Operation Grand Slam, 1952's Operation Mainbrace and 1957's Operation Strikeback (pictured). as well as making ten deployments to the Mediterranean Sea (see Table 4 below). VF-33 joined CVG-6 aboard Midway in 1954.

The group flew on board the Navy's first nuclear-powered aircraft carrier, the recently commissioned , on 22 June 1962. The air group also participated in RipTide III from 3–5 August, which involved long-range simulated nuclear strikes against targets off the Portuguese and Spanish coasts, including 14 strikes and nine call strikes, all opposed.

The group embarked on board the Enterprise during its first deployment to the Mediterranean, passing the Rock of Gibraltar on 16 August 1962.  CVG-6 participated in Lafayette II, 7 September, which involved 14 scheduled conventional strikes coordinated with aircraft from  against multiple targets in southern France, with opposition provided by French air force and naval aircraft. The air group was involved in Indian Summer from 7–8 September, comprising three long-range, simulated nuclear strikes, with fighter escort by F-4Bs from VF-102, against Spanish targets defended by USAF and Spanish commands assigned to NATO.  Carrier Air Group Six also provided air support during FallEx/High Heels II from 6–20 September as well as Fall Trap from 23–27 September, which was a NATO amphibious exercise.  Enterprise arrived back at Norfolk Naval Station on 11 October 1962.

Carrier Air Group Six subsequently participated in the naval operations during the Cuban Missile Crisis of 1962 as part of Task Force 135, a two-carrier strike force consisting of CAG-6's home carrier, the Enterprise, and the supercarrier , operating south of the Windward Passage, between Cuba and the island of Hispaniola and southward, in the vicinity of latitude 18°N, longitude 74°30'W. CAG-6 was augmented with ten additional A4D-4N Skyhawks of Attack Squadron 34 (VA-34) during the night of 26/27 October 1962. For its participation in the Cuban Missile Crisis, Carrier Air Group Six received the Armed Forces Expeditionary Medal.

Deployments
The deployments of CVG-6 are listed below.

Air group composition

Operation Grand Slam (1952)
Carrier Air Group Six embarked on USS Midway (CVB-41) during NATO Operation Grand Slam:

Operation Mainbrace (1952)
Carrier Air Group Six embarked on USS Midway (CVB-41) during NATO Operation Mainbrace:

Operation Strikeback (1957)
Carrier Air Group Six embarked on USS Intrepid (CVA-11) during NATO Operation Strikeback:

Cuban Missile Crisis (1962)
Carrier Air Group Six embarked on USS Enterprise (CVAN-65) during the Cuban Missile Crisis:

Carrier Air Wing 6 (1963–1993)

On 20 December 1963 all Carrier Air Groups were redesignated Carrier Air Wings and Carrier Air Group Six became Carrier Air Wing Six (CVW-6). The air wing participated in Operation Sea Orbit, the first around-the-world voyage made by nuclear-powered surface ships, in 1964 (pictured).

CVW-6 embarked on the new supercarrier  for its 1965 shakedown cruise, and during that ship's second deployment to the Mediterranean Sea, CVW-6 was operating with the U.S. Sixth Fleet when the Six-Day War broke out between Israel and its Arab neighbors on 5 June 1967.  America escorting destroyers detected an unknown submarine contact on 7 June, and a Sikorsky SH-3A Sea King from Helicopter Antisubmarine Squadron (HS-9) assisted in tracking this contact. CVW-6 aircraft provided air cover for the stricken , which had been attacked by Israeli military forces, and it also dispatched two helicopters to evacuate the seriously injured to the America.

Carrier Air Wing Six made its first combat deployment in 1968 upon the America. During this deployment, CVW-6 spent a total of 112 days at Yankee Station off the coast of Vietnam, attacking roads, waterways, trucks, bridges, as well as lighters, barges, and other logistical support watercraft. They also attacked petroleum storage areas, truck parks, and cave storage areas to impede the flow of men and war materials to the south during the Tet Offensive. On 10 July 1968, Lt. Roy Cash Jr. (pilot) and Lt. (j.g.) This was the first MiG "kill" in the Vietnam War for CVW-6. America and Carrier Air Wing Six were awarded the Navy Unit Commendation for this deployment.

During that ship's subsequent deployment to the Mediterranean Sea, CVW-6 conducted air strikes against Syrian positions that were attacking U.S. Marine positions in Lebanon. Carrier Air Group Six received the Armed Forces Expeditionary Medal for Operation Urgent Fury.

It participated in a joint U.S.-Egyptian training exercise (Operation Sea Wind) and Display Determination '86, which featured low-level coordinated strikes and air combat maneuvering training over Turkey. CVW-6 subsequently participated in Ocean Safari '87, a six-week cruise in the North Atlantic which was highlighted by operations with NATO forces posing as aggressors lurking in Norwegian fjords. A year later, the air wing participated in Ocean Venture '88 in the Atlantic, the Gulf of Mexico, and the Caribbean, and then provided air support for Operation Earnest Will.

During its final overseas deployment, CVW-6 participated in three multi-lateral exercises (Harmonie Sud Est, Iles D'Or, and Display Determination '91), and also provided air support for Operation Provide Comfort. Carrier Air Group Six received the Armed Forces Expeditionary Medal for Provide Comfort. (see Table 5 below).

Deployments
The deployments of CVW-6 are listed below.

Air wing composition

Operation Sea Orbit (1964)
Carrier Air Wing Six embarked on USS Enterprise (CVAN-65) during Operation Sea Orbit:

Six-Day War (1967)
Carrier Air Wing Six embarked on USS America (CVA-66) during the Six-Day War:

Vietnam War (1968)
Carrier Air Wing Six embarked on USS America (CVA-66) during the Vietnam War:

Yom Kippur War (1973)
Carrier Air Wing Six embarked on USS Franklin D. Roosevelt (CVA-42) during the Yom Kippur War:

Operation Urgent Fury (1983)
Carrier Air Wing Six embarked on USS Independence (CV-62) during Operation Urgent Fury:

Ocean Safari 1987
Carrier Air Wing Six embarked on USS Forrestal (CV-59) during NATO exercise Ocean Safari 1987:

Operation Earnest Will (1988)
Carrier Air Wing Six embarked on USS Forrestal (CV-59) during Operation Earnest Will:

Operation Provide Comfort (1991)
Carrier Air Wing Six embarked on USS Forrestal (CV-59) during Operation Provide Comfort:

Disestablishment

Carrier Air Wing Six shifted to USS Forrestal (CV-59) when USS Independence (CV-62) underwent its Service Life Extension Program (SLEP) overhaul at the Philadelphia Naval Shipyard in 1986.  Following the completion of its SLEP, Independence sailed to its new home port at the San Diego Naval Base with Carrier Air Wing 5.  With the shifting of Forrestal to a naval aviation training role as AVT-59, plus post-Cold War budget cutbacks, Carrier Air Wing Six (CVW-6) was disestablished on 1 April 1993.

Final composition
Carrier Air Wing Six embarked in USS Forrestal (CV-59):

Awards and commendations

Navy Unit Commendation (1968)

Armed Forces Expeditionary Medal
Cuban Missile Crisis (1962)
Operation Urgent Fury (1983)
Operation Earnest Will (1988)

Other groups associated with the CVG-6 designation
On 15 March 1943 the first Carrier Air Group to bear the designation Carrier Air Group SIX (CVG-6) was established. It served through the remainder of WWII and was disestablished on 29 October 1945, that air group replaced the Enterprise Air Group aboard USS Enterprise (CV-6). The Enterprise Air Group had been established on 1 July 1938 and disestablished on 1 September 1942.  Due to the manner in which the United States Navy determines unit lineage, in which a unit's lineage begins at establishment and ends at disestablishment, the Enterprise Air Group,  Carrier Air Group SIX, and Carrier Air Wing SIX are three separate and distinct units and do not share lineages.

See also
Edward "Butch" O'Hare

Notes

References

Other sources

External links
 USS Enterprise CV-6 Association — Air Groups
 USS Intrepid Association
 USS Hancock CV/CVA-19 Official Association Web Site — War History, April 1944 – October 1945
 USS Hancock Tribute Site
 USS Forrestal Association
 USS Independence CV-62 Association Inc. — CVW-6 Page
 USS America Veterans Association — Air Wing History

 CVW-06
1938 establishments in the United States
1993 disestablishments in the United States
Military units and formations established in 1938
Military units and formations disestablished in 1993